Hajjiabad-e Hajji Safar (also Romanized as Ḩājjīābād-e Ḩājjī Şafar; also known as Ḩājjīābād) is a village in Bala Jowayin Rural District, in the Central District of Jowayin County, Razavi Khorasan Province, Iran. At the 2006 census, its population was 1,858, in 447 families.

References 

Populated places in Joveyn County